Cedric Williams (30 March 1913 – December 1999) was a British cinematographer.

Selected filmography
 The Fatal Night (1948)
 A Gunman Has Escaped (1948)
 Man in Black (1949)
 Doctor Morelle (1949)
 The Adventures of PC 49 (1949)
 Celia (1949)
 Dick Barton Strikes Back (1949)
 Third Time Lucky (1949)
 Meet Simon Cherry (1949)
 Room to Let (1950)
 The Fake (1953)
 The Flaw (1955)
 The Gelignite Gang (1956)

References

External links
 

1913 births
1999 deaths
British cinematographers
People from Birkenhead